Contemporary Review has been used as a name for a number of magazines:

 The Contemporary Review
 Contemporary review 现代评论